Centre for Tourism and Cultural Change (CTCC) is an international centre for critical research relating to the relationships between tourism, tourists and culture based at Leeds Metropolitan University, England. The CTCC engages in pure and applied research, postgraduate education and professional development, consultancy, publications and conference organisation. In addition, the CTCC works to maximise the potential of tourism to promote and support cultural diversity, stimulate intercultural dialogue and contribute to the achievement of the United Nations Millennium Development Goals, while maintaining a critical and creative approach.

References

External links
www.tourism-culture.com
Contemporary Art Research Centre, Leeds Metropolitan University, UK
Institute for European Ethnology/ Folklore, Innsbruck University, Austria

Leeds Beckett University
Tourism in England
English culture